The 6th congressional district of South Carolina is in central and eastern South Carolina. It includes all of Allendale, Bamberg, Clarendon, Colleton, Hampton, Jasper  and Williamsburg counties and parts of Beaufort, Berkeley, Calhoun, Charleston, Dorchester, Orangeburg, Richland and Sumter counties.  

The district's current configuration dates from a deal struck in the early 1990s between state Republicans and Democrats in the South Carolina General Assembly to create a majority-black district. The rural counties of the historical black belt in South Carolina make up much of the district, but it sweeps south to include most of the majority-black precincts in and around Charleston, and sweeps west to include most of the majority-black precincts in and around Columbia. It also includes most of the majority black areas near Beaufort (though not Beaufort itself).

From 1993 to 2013, the district stretched from the Pee Dee to the Atlantic Coast. The district borders were shifted south in the 2012 redistricting.  It lost its share of the Pee Dee while picking up almost all of the majority-black precincts in the Lowcountry. It now takes in part of the area near the South Carolina-Georgia border, reaching just far enough to the north to grab its share of Columbia itself. In all of its configurations, its politics have been dominated by black voters in the Columbia and Charleston areas.

Following the Reconstruction era, the white Democratic-dominated legislature passed Jim Crow laws, as well as a new constitution in 1895 that effectively disfranchised blacks, crippling the Republican Party in the state. For most of the next 60 years, South Carolina was essentially a one-party state dominated by the Democrats, and blacks were nearly excluded from the political system.

Demographic and political changes have included the Great Migration of blacks out of the state during the Jim Crow era in the first half of the 20th century. At the same time, many white Democrats felt chagrin at the national party's greater support of civil rights for blacks from the 1940s onward, and began splitting their tickets in federal elections.  After successes of the Civil Rights Movement in gaining passage of federal legislation in the mid-1960s to enforce their constitutional rights and ability to vote, blacks in South Carolina supported national Democratic candidates. Even before then, white conservatives had begun splitting their tickets and voting for Republicans at the federal level as early as the 1950s, and gradually began moving into the Republican Party in the 1980s.

Since the late 20th century, South Carolina politics have been very racially polarized. Republicans in South Carolina have been mostly white, and most African Americans in the state continue to support the Democrats. In the 21st century, the 6th is considered the only "safe" Democratic district in the state.

From 1883 to 1993, this district included the northeastern part of the state, from Darlington to Myrtle Beach. In this configuration, it was a classic "Yellow Dog" Democratic district; from the end of Reconstruction until 1983, it only elected two Republicans, both for a single term.  In 2012, the new 7th congressional district was created; it includes much of the territory that was in the 6th for most of the 20th century.

Jim Clyburn, a Democrat and the Majority Whip from 2019 to 2023, has represented this district since first being elected in 1992.

Counties 
Counties in the 2023-2033 district map.
 Allendale County
 Bamberg County
 Calhoun County 
 Charleston County (part)
 Clarendon County
 Colleton County (part)
 Dorchester County (part)
 Florence County (part)
 Hampton County
 Jasper County (part)
 Orangeburg County (part)
 Richland County (part)
 Sumter County (part)
 Williamsburg County

Election results from presidential races

List of members representing the district

Recent election results

2012

2014

2016

2018

2020

2022

See also

South Carolina's congressional districts
List of United States congressional districts

References

 Congressional Biographical Directory of the United States 1774–present

06
Bamberg County
Berkeley County
Calhoun County
Charleston County
Clarendon County
Colleton County
Dorchester County
Florence County
Georgetown County
Lee County
Marion County
Orangeburg County
Richland County
Sumter County
Williamsburg County